Punasa is a tehsil of Khandwa district, Madhya Pradesh, India. It had a total population of 236,806 as per the 2011 Census of India.
Punasa is an ancient city, with many places of worship, like many other cities in India. The city is over a thousand years old and is surrounded by a forest in the Narmada river valley. It is 120 km (75 mi) from Indore, the commercial capital of the state.

Indirasagar Dam[edit]
The Indira Sagar Dam is a multipurpose project of the state Madhya Pradesh on the Narmada River at the town of Narmada Nagar, Punasa in the Khandwa district of Madhya Pradesh in India. The foundation stone of the project was laid by late Smt Indira Gandhi, former Prime Minister of India on 23 October 1984. The construction of the main dam started in 1992. The downstream projects of ISP are Omkareshwar, Maheshwar, and Sardar Sarovar Project. To build it, a town of 22,000 people and 100 villages were displaced[2]

References 

Khandwa district